May Steele (8 January 2020)  was a unionist politician in Northern Ireland.

Living in Larne, Steele joined the Ulster Unionist Party (UUP) in the 1950s, and became active in County Antrim.  She was close to Vanguard Unionist Progressive Party leader William Craig, but remained a member of the UUP.

In 1990 Steele was appointed as a Justice of the Peace (JP) for County Antrim.

At the 1993 Northern Ireland local elections and 1997, Steele stood unsuccessfully for the UUP on Larne Borough Council.  She also stood in the Northern Ireland Forum election in East Antrim and was elected, although she lost her seat at the 1998 Northern Ireland Assembly election.  Despite this loss, and a reputation as a hardliner, she remained a prominent supporter of party leader David Trimble, and called for support of the Good Friday Agreement.

Steele devoted much of her time to the Ulster Women's Unionist Council, becoming Chairman of the organisation.  In the 2000 Birthday Honours, she received the MBE for political and public service.

At the 2016 UUP annual conference, the party leader Mike Nesbit made Steele honorary president of the party.

Steele died on 8 January, 2020, at the age of 83.

References

Year of birth missing
Members of the Northern Ireland Forum
Members of the Order of the British Empire
People from Larne
Ulster Unionist Party politicians
Women in the politics of Northern Ireland
20th-century politicians from Northern Ireland
Northern Ireland justices of the peace